Rudd's mouse or the white-bellied brush-furred rat (Uranomys ruddi) is the only member of the genus Uranomys.  This animal is closely related to the spiny mice, brush-furred mice, and the link rat.

Description
Head and body sizes range from 8.4-13.4 cm long.  Tail length is 5.3-7.9 cm.  Weight is 41-53 g.  The hairs on the back of this species are stiff like the brush-furred mice, but not spiny as in Acomys.  The belly is white and feet are covered in white hairs.  Incisors project anteriorly.

Natural history
The animal is known across a wide range in Africa, but is never common.  They are usually taken in savannah habitat.  Rudd's mouse is thought to be nocturnal.  It feeds predominantly on insects.

References

  Database entry includes a brief justification of why this species is of least concern
Nowak, R. M. 1999. Walker's Mammals of the World, Vol. 2. Johns Hopkins University Press, London.

Deomyine rodents
Rodents of Africa
Mammals described in 1909
Taxa named by Guy Dollman